A VIP is a very important person.

VIP or V.I.P. may also refer to:

Entertainment
 V.I.P. (comedian) Indian television comedian
 VIP (magazine), an Irish celebrity lifestyle fashion magazine
 VIP, a video brand formerly used by Japanese adult video company Atlas21
 V.I.P. (talk show), a 1973–1983 Canadian television talk show
 V.I.P. (American TV series), a 1998–2002 American television series starring Pamela Anderson
 VIP (South Korean TV series), a 2019 South Korean television series
 VIP Magazin, a Moldovan celebrity lifestyle magazine

Film
 Very Important Person (film), 1961 British film
 The V.I.P.s (film), 1963 film
 VIP my Brother Superman, 1968 Italian animation film
 V.I.P. (1991 film), Polish film by Juliusz Machulski
 V. I. P. (1997 film), Indian Tamil film
 VIPs (film), 2010 Brazilian film
 Velaiilla Pattadhari, 2014 film also known as VIP
 V.I.P. (2017 film), South Korean film

Music
 V.I.P. (Hungarian band), defunct pop boy group
 The V.I.P.'s (band), English band of the 1960s
 Voices in Public, Canadian boy group
 VVIP (hip hop group) Ghanaian hiplife band once known as VIP
 V.I.P. (album), 2000 album by Jungle Brothers
 "V.I.P." (Bro'Sis song) (2003)
 "V.I.P" (Ice Prince song) (2013)
 "VIP" (Aya Nakamura song) (2022)
 V.I.P., subsidiary label of Motown Records
 "VIP", song by Kesha from Animal
 The V.I.P. (The Vanilla Ice Posse), the rapper's DJs and backup dancers
 Victory in Praise Music and Arts Seminar Mass Choir, an organization founded by John P. Kee
 "V.I.P.", song by Françoise Hardy

Science
 Vasoactive intestinal peptide, a peptide hormone
 Ventral intraparietal sulcus in the lateral parietal lobe of the human brain

Telecommunications and Internet telephony
 Vip mobile, Serbian mobile network operator
 Virtual IP address

Other uses 
 Plymouth VIP, a luxury version of the Plymouth Fury, 1966-1969
 Vacuum insulated panel, a form of thermal insulation consisting of a nearly gas-tight enclosure surrounding a rigid core, from which the air has been evacuated
 Variable Information Printing, a form of on-demand printing
 VimpelCom's stock symbol
 VIP Ecuador, an Ecuadorian airline
 VIP Industries, a luggage manufacturer based in India
 VIP's (restaurant), an American restaurant chain
 Virgil Partch, a cartoonist who signed his work Vip
 Virgin Islands Party, a political party in the British Virgin Islands
 Virology Science and Technology Institute of the Philippines, also known as the Virology Institute of the Philippines (VIP)
 Visually impaired person

See also
 VIP style or VIP Car, a Japanese car customisation
 Veep (disambiguation)
 VIPS (disambiguation)